Andy Reyes (born 6 April 1999) is a Costa Rican footballer who plays for Guadalupe.

Career
Reyes started his senior career with Carmelita. In 2018, he signed for Juniors OÖ in the Austrian Football Second League. After that, he played for SC Austria Lustenau.

On 3 August 2020 he moved back to Costa Rica and joined Cartaginés on loan until the end of 2021.

On 29 December 2021, Reyes signed a two-year contract with Deportivo Saprissa.

He signed for Guadalupe F.C. in December 2022.

References

External links 
 This is what they ask the youth '9′s that Costa Rica has in Europe
 Andy Reyes, the Tico who fights in Austrian football to give his parents a house
 Andy Reyes excited to score 15 goals to jump to a better European team
 The CONCACAF adventure of Andy Reyes

1999 births
People from San Ramón, Costa Rica
Living people
Costa Rican footballers
Costa Rican expatriate footballers
Association football forwards
A.D. Carmelita footballers
FC Juniors OÖ players
SC Austria Lustenau players
C.S. Cartaginés players
Deportivo Saprissa players
Liga FPD players
2. Liga (Austria) players
Costa Rican expatriate sportspeople in Mexico
Costa Rican expatriate sportspeople in Austria
Expatriate footballers in Mexico
Expatriate footballers in Austria
Costa Rica under-20 international footballers